Štefan Matlák (6 February 1934 in Bratislava – 12 April 2003 in Bratislava) was a Slovak football player who competed in the 1964 Summer Olympics.

References

External links 
 

1934 births
2003 deaths
Slovak footballers
Olympic footballers of Czechoslovakia
Olympic silver medalists for Czechoslovakia
Olympic medalists in football
Footballers at the 1964 Summer Olympics
Medalists at the 1964 Summer Olympics
Footballers from Bratislava
FK Inter Bratislava players
Association football defenders
Czechoslovakia international footballers
Czechoslovak footballers